Trickey Pond is a water body in the U.S. state of Maine. The lack of serious pollution in the area contributes to the pond's remarkably good water clarity. At most points in the pond, the entire depth can be seen.

Location

Trickey Pond is located between Sebago Cove (an arm of Sebago Lake) and Brandy Pond, both in the town of Naples. Although the pond's outlet to Sebago Cove flows continuously, the pond has no visible inlets, suggesting Trickey has some active springs. There are two access points: one at the north end, one at the south. Trickey Pond is also home to Camp Skylemar, a summer camp for boys. The camp's waterfront includes swimming lanes, a large inflatable iceberg, waterskiing, wakeboarding, kayaking, and canoeing. Trickey Pond also includes Loon's Haven Family Campground, the only campground on Trickey Pond, that features two sandy beaches, three boat docks, and canoe and kayak and fishing opportunities for campground guests.

Size

Naming
Earlier in the 20th century, the body of water was referred to as "Wenonah Pond". The girl's camp, located on the eastern shore, was named and founded during this period. By the late 1960s, the pond was referred to as "Trickey Pond" when private lots were sold on the western banks. The reason for the name change is unknown.

Fish
The species of fish in the lake, when last surveyed by the Maine Department of Inland Fisheries and Wildlife in 1996, are:

Salmon
Lake trout
Brook trout
Splake
Rainbow smelt
Smallmouth bass
Largemouth bass
Yellow perch
Chain pickerel
Minnows
Golden shiner
White sucker
Hornpout
Banded killifish
Sunfish
Sculpin
American Eel
.

External links
 

Lakes of Cumberland County, Maine
Naples, Maine
Lakes of Maine